Commission of Inquiry is a Union or State government ordered public inquiry either by executive notice or by making ad hoc legislation.

In some cases the judicial courts have intervened and appointed commissioners to inquire into matters of public interest.

See also
List of Indian commissions

References

Indian commissions and inquiries
Law of India